This Is Hot 97 is a reality-based docu-comedy television series that debuted on VH1 on March 31, 2014. The series is executive produced by Mona Scott-Young for Monami Entertainment, Toby Barraud, Stefan Springman, Mala Chapple and Ian Gelfand for Eastern, and Susan Levison, Brad Abramson and Stephen Mintz for VH1.

Synopsis
This Is Hot 97 chronicles the lives of the air staffers and employees who work at Rhythmic Top 40 outlet WQHT/New York City, using a combination of their real life personas mixed in with unscripted and improvised comedic elements.

Cast
 DJ NAIM
 
 Ebro Darden
 Funkmaster Flex
 Laura Stylez

 Peter Rosenberg

Episodes

References

External links

2014 American television series debuts
2014 American television series endings
2010s American parody television series
2010s American reality television series
2010s American workplace comedy television series
English-language television shows
Metafictional television series
Reality television series parodies
Television series about radio
Television series about television
Television shows set in New York City
VH1 original programming